The Mingorrubio Cemetery, also called the Cemetery of El Pardo, is a municipal cemetery on the edge of Madrid, Spain. Mingorrubio is a neighborhood in the northern district of Fuencarral-El Pardo.

Notable burials
 Francisco Franco (1892–1975), general and dictator (Caudillo of Spain (1936–1975)), relocated from Valle de los Caídos on 24 October 2019
 Carmen Polo, 1st Lady of Meirás (1900–1988), Franco's wife, Grandee of Spain
 Carlos Arias Navarro (1908–1989), last Francoist Prime Minister of Spain (1973–1976)
 Luis Carrero Blanco (1904–1973), Spanish Navy admiral, Francoist Prime Minister of Spain (June–December 1973)
 Luis Gutiérrez Soto (1900–1977), architect during the Franco era
 Rafael Trujillo (1891–1961), military dictator of the Dominican Republic (1930–1961), two times President (1930–1938, 1942–1952)
 Ramfis Trujillo (1929–1969), Dominican general, son of Rafael Trujillo

References

External links
 

Cemeteries in Madrid
Francisco Franco
Rafael Trujillo
El Pardo